Ferenc Rácz (born 28 March 1991) is a Hungarian football player who plays for Dorog.

Club statistics

Updated to games played as of 31 March 2018.

References

External links

1991 births
Living people
Sportspeople from Szombathely
Hungarian footballers
Hungary youth international footballers
Association football forwards
Szombathelyi Haladás footballers
FC Ajka players
Kozármisleny SE footballers
MTK Budapest FC players
Pécsi MFC players
Mezőkövesdi SE footballers
Győri ETO FC players
Balmazújvárosi FC players
Kisvárda FC players
Dorogi FC players
Nemzeti Bajnokság I players
Nemzeti Bajnokság II players